Irenia leucoxantha is a moth in the family Oecophoridae. It was described by John Frederick Gates Clarke in 1978. It is found in Chile.

The wingspan is 18–20 mm. The forewings are orange yellow with the extreme edge of the costa white. The surface of the wing with a few widely scattered black scales. The hindwings are pearl white.

References

Moths described in 1978
Oecophorinae
Moths of South America
Endemic fauna of Chile